Thomlinson is a surname. Notable people with the name include:

 Andy Dick, (born Andrew Thomlinson; 1965), American comedian and actor
 Arthur Thomlinson (born 1887), Australian cricketer
 Dave Thomlinson (born 1966), Canadian ice hockey left winger
 John Thomlinson (1692–1761), English clergyman
 Matthew Thomlinson (1617–1681), English soldier who fought for Parliament in the English Civil War
 Ralph Thomlinson (1925–2007), American sociologist and demographer

See also
 Tomlinson (surname)